The National Runaway Safeline (also known as NRS or 1-800-RUNAWAY; formerly known as National Runaway Switchboard) is the national communications system designated by the United States federal government for runaway and homeless youth, their parents and families, teens in crisis, and others who might benefit from its services. It is confidential, anonymous, non-judgmental, non-directive, and free. The hotline number is 1-800-RUNAWAY. Calls are answered every day of the year, 24 hours a day.

The National Runaway Switchboard was started in 1974, in Chicago, IL., by the staff of Metro-Help, a 24 hour crisis phone line. Grants from the Playboy Foundation and the Federal Government, H.E.W., provide the funding.

References

External links 
 National Runaway Safeline

Organizations based in Chicago
Children's charities based in the United States
Charities based in Illinois
Runaway (dependent)